Karl Ludwig Otto Geyer (8 January 1843, Charlottenburg - March 1914, Charlottenburg) was a German sculptor. His brother was the architect, .

Life and work 
His father, Friedrich Wilhelm Ludwig Geyer, was an Archdeacon in the Evangelical Church. From 1859 to 1864, he studied at the Prussian Academy of Arts, and worked in the studios of the sculptor, Hermann Schievelbein. Following  Schievelbein's death in 1867, Geyer took over his studio. He continued his studies in 1869, at the Thorvaldsen Museum in Copenhagen.

After 1891, he taught ornamental and figure modelling at the Technischen Hochschule Charlottenburg (now the Technical University of Berlin), succeeding Bernhard Roemer (1852-1891), who had died suddenly. The following year, he also began teaching at the Arts and Crafts School, where he served as Director from 1904 to 1913. He was named a Professor in 1893. His students included the sculptor, Lilli Wislicenus, and the porcelain artist, Hugo Meisel (1887–1966).

He died shortly after retiring, at the age of seventy-one, and was interred at the Friedhof Wilmersdorf. The grave has not been preserved. A memorial tablet and statue, donated by his daughters, was later placed in the Waldfriedhof Zehlendorf.

Some of his works may be seen outside Germany, at the Gare de Strasbourg, in the main hall. They include two large statues of female allegorical figures, representing Industry and Agriculture, and reliefs on the original façade.

References

Further reading 
 Josefine Hildebrand: Das Leben und Werk des Berliner Bildhauers Otto Geyer (1843–1914), dargestellt unter besonderer Berücksichtigung seiner historischen Figurenfriese, Berlin 1975 (Dissertation)
 Peter Bloch, Sibylle Einholz, Jutta von Simson (Eds.): Ethos und Pathos, die Berliner Bildhauerschule 1786–1914, Gebrüder Mann, 1990 
 Moritz Wullen: Die Deutschen sind im Treppenhaus, der Fries Otto Geyers in der Alten Nationalgalerie, DuMont Lieratur und Kunst Verlag, 2002

External links 

1843 births
1914 deaths
Prussian Academy of Arts alumni
20th-century German sculptors
20th-century German male artists
19th-century German sculptors
German male sculptors